Jeffrey Kwabena Addai (born May 11, 1993) is a Canadian professional soccer player who plays as a midfielder for PEPO.

Career

Tulsa Roughnecks
After playing for both Ottawa Fury and VfR Mannheim, Addai would sign with USL Championship club Tulsa Roughnecks for the 2019 season. Addai was subsequently named vice captain of the club for the 2019 season.

VPS
After one year with Tulsa, Addai signed with Finnish Ykkönen club Vaasan Palloseura on a three year contract.

References

External links

1993 births
Living people
Association football midfielders
Canadian soccer players
Soccer players from Ottawa
Canadian people of Ghanaian descent
Canadian expatriate soccer players
Expatriate soccer players in the United States
Canadian expatriate sportspeople in the United States
Expatriate footballers in Germany
Canadian expatriate sportspeople in Germany
Expatriate footballers in Portugal
Canadian expatriate sportspeople in Portugal
Expatriate footballers in Finland
Canadian expatriate sportspeople in Finland
South Carolina Gamecocks men's soccer players
Flint City Bucks players
K-W United FC players
Ottawa Fury FC players
VfR Mannheim players
FC Tulsa players
Vaasan Palloseura players
USL League Two players
USL Championship players
Ykkönen players
Ottawa South United players